F2C is a program that converts Fortran 77 to C.

F2C may also refer to:

 Bristol F.2C Badger, an aircraft design that was a precursor to the Bristol Badger
 Curtiss F2C, a designation of the Curtiss R2C
 Factory-to-consumer
 F2C, a racing class for model aircraft steered by control line